The 2022 World Games had four cue sports events, which took place in July 2022, in Birmingham, Alabama in United States, at the Birmingham Jefferson Convention Complex.
Originally scheduled to take place in July 2021, the Games were rescheduled for July 2022 as a result of the 2020 Summer Olympics postponement due to the COVID-19 pandemic.

Qualification

Medal table

Medalists

References

External links
 The World Games 2022
 International Billiards and Snooker Federation
 Results book

 
2022 World Games
World Games